was the Bishop of the Roman Catholic Diocese of Takamatsu from his appointment on July 7, 1977, and his retirement on May 14, 2004.

Fukahori was born in Nagasaki, Japan.  He was ordained a Catholic priest on December 22, 1951. He died on September 24, 2009, at the age of 85.

References
Catholic Hierarchy: Bishop Joseph Satoshi Fukahori †

1924 births
2009 deaths
People from Nagasaki
People from Kagawa Prefecture
20th-century Roman Catholic bishops in Japan
Japanese Roman Catholic bishops